The Fort Myers Mighty Mussels are a Minor League Baseball team of the Florida State League and the Single-A affiliate of the Minnesota Twins. They are located in Fort Myers, Florida, and play their home games at the Lee County Sports Complex at Hammond Stadium, which has a capacity of 7,500 and opened in 1991. The park is also used as the Minnesota Twins' spring training facility.

The majority owner is Kaufy Baseball, LLC, a privately held company managed by John Martin, who purchased a controlling interest in the club from Andrew Kaufmann in January 2022.

History
The Mighty Mussels franchise was founded in 1926, as the Fort Myers Palms. One year later, the team moved to Miami, and were renamed the Miami Hustlers. The team became temporarily inactive, with the rest of the Florida State League, midway through the 1928 season. Even though the Florida State League resumed play in 1936, the Hustlers remained inactive until they were reactivated by the FSL during the 1961–1962 offseason to serve as the Class D affiliate of the Philadelphia Phillies. The team was renamed the Miami Marlins in honor of the original Marlins of the Triple-A International League who had moved to San Juan, Puerto Rico (and subsequently Charleston, West Virginia), following the 1960 season.

In 1963, there was a restructuring of the classification system of all Minor League Baseball, which resulted in the FSL changing from Class D to its current status of Class A-Advanced. They became a Baltimore Orioles affiliate in 1966, and were renamed the Miami Orioles after their MLB parent club from 1971 to 1981. The Orioles owned the franchise until it was sold to an investment group led by then-Class AAA American Association president Joe Ryan on January 30, 1976.

Upon the Baltimore Orioles' severing of their affiliation with the Miami Orioles following the 1981 season, the franchise reverted to the Marlins name and participated in the 1982 FSL season as an independent entry. Without a Major League affiliate, this team was composed of undrafted players from the area, free agents from various organizations and players on loan from the Baltimore Orioles, San Diego Padres, and Oakland A's organizations.

The following season the Miami Marlins became a San Diego Padres affiliate. This partnership lasted two years and the Marlins were without a parent club for the 1985 season. They filled their roster with ten former major leaguers looking to rejuvenate their careers, including Derrel Thomas, who made it back to MLB later that season with the Philadelphia Phillies. The Marlins continued this practice through the 1988 season. One of their signees in 1987, Dennis Martínez, also returned to MLB, signing with the Montreal Expos later that season. In 1987, the team started receiving some players on loan from the Tokyo Giants. This lasted through the 1988 season.

In 1988, the team began the season at Bobby Maduro Miami Stadium, but moved later in the season to the Miami-Hialeah Lakes High School field. The Marlins had per-game attendance totals of approximately 100 fans.

On , the South Florida Baseball Club Limited Partnership purchased the Marlins and were renamed the Miami Miracle. They moved the team from Miami Stadium,  which the team had called home for the vast majority of its time in South Florida, to Florida International University's University Park with some games to be held at Key West High School. South Florida BC LP consisted of Stuart Revo, managing partner, Marvin Goldklang, South Florida commercial real estate developer Michael M. Adler; Potamkin Television, New Age Broadcasting automobile dealership group Potamkin Companies president Alan Potamkin; Sillerman-Magee Communication Management Corp. CEO Robert Sillerman, actor Bill Murray and recording artist Jimmy Buffett. E.J. Narcise was named general manager. While having a partial affiliation with the Cleveland Indians and the Tokyo Giants of the Japanese league, the Miracle were considered an independent entry in the FSL.

The team received only nine players from the Indians for the 1989 season and had to scramble to find players like pitcher Longo Garcia who was released by the San Francisco Giants organization having been a tenth round draft pick. Jim Gattis was named manager by April 1989.

The Miracle were sold again a year later to the Marv Goldklang Group. Mike Veeck (son of Hall of Fame inductee Bill Veeck, and author of the book, Fun is Good) also became part owner of the organization while Murray and Buffett still maintained their shares as well.

In 1990, the team moved again, playing its home games at Pompano Beach Municipal Stadium. The team spent two seasons in Pompano Beach with future big league skipper Fredi González at the helm.

In 1992, with the impending arrival of MLB's Florida Marlins, the Goldklang Group returned the Miracle to Fort Myers. The Miracle operated as a co-op club with the Minnesota Twins that season, and became a full Twins affiliate a year later. The current Player Development Contract runs through 2018.

In December 2019, the franchise announced that it would be rebrand ahead of the 2020 season and become known as the Fort Myers Mighty Mussels.

Mighty Mussels in Fort Myers

Since moving to Fort Myers for the 1992 season, the Mighty Mussels have qualified for the Florida State League Playoffs eight times. As the Miracle, the club won the FSL West Division first half in 2003 and 2008 and the FSL West second half in 1995, 2000 and 2006. In 2009, the Florida State League adopted a North–South setup of divisions. In that year, the Miracle won both the FSL South first and second half under manager Jeff Smith. Despite a regular season record of 80–58 and winning game one of a best-of-three series on the road, the Charlotte Stone Crabs defeated the Miracle in games two and three.

After a three-season hiatus, the Miracle returned to the FSL Playoffs under first-year manager Doug Mientkiewicz. Guiding a star-studded team of Twins prospects such as Miguel Sano, Kennys Vargas and Eddie Rosario, the Miracle won the first half in the FSL South with a 45–22 record. The 45 wins tied the franchise record for the most in a single half and the winning percentage of .672 marked the best for a half in team history. Posting the best overall record in the Florida State League at 79–56 during the regular season, the Miracle again fell to the Stone Crabs in the FSL South Divisional Playoff. Charlotte held the league-best Fort Myers offense, that included the consensus top prospect in baseball Byron Buxton, to just one run in a two-game sweep.

2014 championship season
Entering the 2014 season, the Miracle had appeared in the Florida State League Championship series twice; losing to the Daytona Cubs in 1995 and 2008. For a second consecutive season, Mientkiewicz led the Miracle to a first half title in the FSL South, narrowly edging the St. Lucie Mets by one game in the standings with a final day win, 4–0, over the Bradenton Marauders. Fort Myers finished with a first half record of 41–28 with a roster featuring top prospects José Berríos, Jorge Polanco and Adam Brett Walker. During the 2014 campaign, Walker broke the Miracle franchise record for home runs in a season with 25; previously held by Brock Peterson with 21 in 2006. Walker was also a 2014 FSL All-Star Game MVP and Home Run Derby Champion at the 2014 FSL All-Star Game in Bradenton, at McKechnie Field. In the second half, the Miracle posted a record of 41–29 for an overall mark of 82–57, second-best in team history.

In the FSL South Divisional Playoff, the Miracle faced Bradenton. Trailing 7–3 in the top of the fourth inning, Jason Kanzler hit an opposite field grand slam to tie the game in the first of a best-of-three series. After the fifth inning, play was halted for 58 minutes due to rain. When the game resumed in the top of the sixth, Dalton Hicks drove in the eventual game-winning run with a single. The Miracle won game one, 8–7, and Kanzler had six runs batted in. In game two, the Miracle scored six runs in the bottom of the third inning to take 6–1 lead. Miracle starter D. J. Baxendale earned the win with six innings allowing just one unearned run and five strikeouts. After a two-game sweep of the Marauders, the Miracle advanced to the FSL Championship series for the third time in team history.

Facing the Cubs again, the Miracle hosted the first two games of the best-of-five series at JetBlue Park. The Miracle pitching staff allowed just one run in a pair of wins. Fort Myers took game one, 5–1, and game two, 5–0. With a 2–0 series lead for the Miracle, the Cubs staved off elimination in game three at Jackie Robinson Ballpark in Daytona, Florida After a two-hour, seven-minute delay, the Cubs and Miracle engaged in a back-and-forth battle with Daytona eventually going on to win, 8–7. The Cubs trailed 6–5 in the bottom of the eighth inning, but took the lead on a three-run homer by Wilson Contreras. After the Cubs' win, the two teams had to wait a day after heavy storms made the field in Daytona unplayable. On Monday, September 8, the Miracle and Cubs played game four. Fort Myers built a 2–0 lead midway through the fourth inning. Daytona tied the game in the sixth. Going into extra innings, Kanzler gave the Miracle a 4–2 lead with a two-run homer in the top of the eleventh. Zack Jones recorded a perfect ninth inning, striking out Contreras for the save. The FSL Championship was the first in team history since moving to Fort Myers in 1992. The series win also marked the first time the Daytona Cubs had lost a FSL Playoff series.

Season-by-season
These statistics are current through the 2022 season, and include seasons dating back to 1971.

  The Miracle finished with the same record as the Dunedin Blue Jays, but since the Blue Jays had the better head-to-head record in the first half (4–2), the Miracle did not win the division.
  The playoffs were canceled due to the impending threat from Hurricane Dorian.

Media appearances
The Miracle's name and logo appeared in the 1998 film Major League: Back to the Minors. Gus Cantrell (Scott Bakula) pitched for the Miracle before retiring to become the manager of the Buzz.

Roster

FSL All-Stars

1992 – Troy Buckley, Brian Raabe
1993 – Brent Brede, Steve Hazlett†, Damian Miller
1994 – Gus Gandarillas, Andrew Kontorinis‡, Matt Lawton‡‡, Scott Moten, Chad Roper††
1995 – Shane Bowers
1996 – Mike Moriarty, Javier Valentín
1997 – Chad Allen, Phil Haigler, Jacque Jones, Brad Niedermaier, David Ortiz†† ‡‡, A. J. Pierzynski‡‡
1998 – Joe Mays, Chad Moeller, Tommy Peterman‡, 
1999 – Matt LeCroy, Kyle Lohse
2000 – Brandon Masters, Juan Rincón, Saúl Rivera, Rubén Salazar, Brad Thomas††
2001 – Ronnie Corona, Juan Padilla
2002 – Beau Kemp, Josh Rabe, Matt Scanlon††
2003 – J.D. Durbin, Jason Kubel, Joe Mauer‡‡
2004 – Scott Baker††, Travis Bowyer††, Kaulana Kuhaulua, Francisco Liriano, José Morales, Justin Olson
2005 – Nick Blackburn, Matt Moses, Denard Span
2006 – Alexi Casilla, Matt Garza††, Kyle Geiger, Brandon Roberts, Kevin Slowey
2007 – Eddie Morlan, Ryan Mullins††, Oswaldo Sosa
2008 – Robert Delaney, Brian Dinkelman, Jeff Manship, Wilson Ramos, Anthony Slama, Rene Tosoni†, Danny Valencia
2009 – David Bromberg, Chris Cates, Carlos Gutierrez††, Steven Hirschfeld, Daniel Lehmann††, Chris Parmelee, Ben Revere, Steve Singleton, Spencer Steedley
2010 – Billy Bullock, Kyle Gibson††,  Chris Herrmann, Yangervis Solarte††
2011 – Brian Dozier††, Bruce Pugh††, Danny Rams, Dakota Watts
2012 – Ricky Bowen, Pat Dean, Josmil Pinto, Daniel Santana
2013 – D.J. Baxendale††, Matt Koch, Zack Jones, Taylor Rogers, Miguel Sano††, Kennys Vargas, Corey Williams
2014 – José Berríos, David Hurlbut†, Brett Lee†, Adam Brett Walker‡
2015 - JT Chargois, Chih-Wei Hu, Brandon Peterson, Alex Swim
2016 - Edgar Corcino, Stephen Gonsalvez, Nick Gordon, Tyler Jay, Felix Jorge, Yorman Landa, Todd Van Steensel, Trey Vavra
2017 - Sam Clay, Max Murphy, Brian Navarreto, Chris Paul, Dereck Rodriguez
2018 - Travis Blankenhorn, Jaylen Davis, Taylor Grzelakowski, Jimmy Kerrigan, Andrew Vasquez
2019 - Lewin Diaz, Tom Hackimer, Ryan Jeffers, Trevor Larnach, Royce Lewis, Alex Phillips, Johan Quezada, Bryan Sammons

 MLB ended Minor League All Star games in 2021. Only postseason All Stars will be recognized.

† Injured & did not play
†† Promoted & did not play
‡ FSL All-Star Game MVP
‡‡ MLB All-Star

Notable franchise alumni

Baseball Hall of Fame franchise alumni

Ferguson Jenkins (1962–1963) Inducted, 1991
 Eddie Murray (1974) Inducted, 2003
 Jim Palmer (1967–1968) Inducted, 1990
 Cal Ripken Jr. (1979) Inducted, 2007

Notable alumni
 Rick Aguilera (1996) 3 x MLB All-Star
 John Altobelli (1985) longtime Orange Coast College coach
 Scott Baker (2004, 2008–2009, 2012)
 Don Baylor (1969) MLB All-Star; 1995 NL Manager of the Year; 1979 AL Most Valuable Player
 Jose Canseco (1982) 6 x MLB All-Star; 1986 AL Rookie of the Year; 1988 AL Most Valuable Player
 Terry Crowley (1966–1967)
 Michael Cuddyer (1997) 2 x MLB All-Star; 2013 NL Batting Title
 Storm Davis (1980)
 Mike Easler (1990, MGR) MLB All-Star
 Ed Farmer (1985) MLB All-Star
 Mike Flanagan (1973–1974) MLB All-Star; 1979 AL Cy Young Award
 Tim Foli (1985)
 Matt Garza (2006)
 LaTroy Hawkins (1994)
 Torii Hunter (1995–1996) 5 x MLB All-Star
 Alex Johnson (1962) MLB All-Star; 1970 AL Batting Title
 Jimmy Johnston (1926)
 Jacque Jones (1997)
 Roberto Kelly (1997) 2 x MLB All-Star
 Jason Kubel (2003, 2011)
 Matt Lawton (1994, 1999) 2 x MLB All-Star
 Francisco Liriano (2004, 2008) MLB All-Star
 Kyle Lohse (1999)
 Dennis Martinez (1974, 1980, 1987) 4 x MLB All-Star
 Joe Mauer (2003–2004, 2007, 2009, 2011) 6 x MLB All-Star; 3 x AL Batting Title (2006, 2008–2009); 2009 AL Most Valuable Player
 Doug Mientkiewicz (1995–1996)(2013–2014, MGR)
 Damian Miller (1993) MLB All-Star
 Eric Milton (2003) MLB All-Star
 Pat Neshek (2003–2004, 2010) 2 x MLB All-Star
 Johnny Oates (1967) 1996 AL Manager of the Year
 David Ortiz (1997, 2001) 10 x MLB All-Star; 2013 World Series Most Valuable Player
 Mike Pagliarulo (1992)
 Carl Pavano (2012) MLB All-Star
 Glen Perkins (2007, 2009, 2017) 3 x MLB All-Star
 A. J. Pierzynski (1997) 2 x MLB All-Star
 Nick Punto (2007)
 Brad Radke (1993, 2002) MLB All-Star
 J. C. Romero (1997, 2000)
 Miguel Sano (2013) MLB All-Star
 Benito Santiago (1983) 5 x MLB All-Star; 1989 NL Rookie of the Year
 Bryn Smith (1975–1976)
 Denard Span (2005)
 Sammy Stewart (1976)
 Derrel Thomas (1985)
 Mike Torrez (1985)  
 Todd Walker (1994)
 Rondell White (2007) MLB All-Star
 John Wockenfuss (1986)
 Chris Herrmann (2010–2011)

References

External links

Official website

Minnesota Twins minor league affiliates
Baseball teams established in 1926
Professional baseball teams in Florida
Baseball in Fort Myers, Florida
Florida State League teams
San Diego Padres minor league affiliates
Baltimore Orioles minor league affiliates
Philadelphia Phillies minor league affiliates
1926 establishments in Florida